Matthias Stingl (born 27 February 1998) is a German footballer who plays as a defender for SV Wacker Burghausen.

References

External links
 

1998 births
Living people
People from Deggendorf (district)
Sportspeople from Lower Bavaria
German footballers
Germany youth international footballers
Association football defenders
FC Bayern Munich II players
SC Paderborn 07 players
Regionalliga players
3. Liga players
Footballers from Bavaria